San Giuseppe is a Roman Catholic church in Siena, Tuscany, Italy.

The church was commissioned by the contrada dell'Onda and begun in 1521. Construction continued for the whole century.

The façade, finished in 1653, is mostly in brickwork, with two superimposed orders divided by pilaster strips. The interior is on the Greek Cross plan, surmounted by an octagonal dome with a lantern. Decoration is attributed to the Nasini family. The crypt, a suggestive 16th century hall, contains the contrada's museum.

Notes

Roman Catholic churches completed in 1653
17th-century Roman Catholic church buildings in Italy
Giuseppe
Baroque architecture in Siena
Renaissance architecture in Siena
1653 establishments in Italy